Eric Bell (13 February 1922 – 2004) was an English footballer who played in the Football League for Blackburn Rovers. He had previously played for Blyth Shipyard.

References

1922 births
2004 deaths
People from Bedlington
Footballers from Northumberland
English footballers
English Football League players
Blackburn Rovers F.C. players
Association football midfielders